Marlena Jansson (born 20 November 1970) is a Swedish orienteering competitor.  She is three times Relay World Champion as a member of the Swedish winning team in 1991, 1993 and 1997, as well as having a silver medal from 1995 and a bronze medal from 1999.  She also shared bronze with Anna Bogren in the Short distance World Championship in 1995. She obtained the first place in the Overall World Cup in 1994 and second one in 1996. She is five times individual Swedish Champion (1987, 1990, 1995, 1997 and 1998), and Nordic Relay Champion from 1992.

References

External links
 
 

1970 births
Living people
Swedish orienteers
Female orienteers
Foot orienteers
World Orienteering Championships medalists
Junior World Orienteering Championships medalists